Michaela Hrůzová (née Sejpalová; born 6 February 1998) is a Czech short track speed skater. She competed in the 2018 Winter Olympics. She competed at the 2022 Winter Olympics.

References

1998 births
Living people
Czech female short track speed skaters
Olympic short track speed skaters of the Czech Republic
Short track speed skaters at the 2018 Winter Olympics
Short track speed skaters at the 2022 Winter Olympics